Li Rusong (1549–1598) was a Ming dynasty general from Tieling, Liaodong. He was a Ming army commander in the first half of the Imjin War that took place in the Korean peninsula. Upon the request of the Korean King Seonjo of Joseon, the Ming Wanli Emperor sent reinforcements to support the Korean military in its war effort against the Japanese invasion masterminded by Toyotomi Hideyoshi. 

His father, Li Chengliang, was also a Ming general, who defended Liaodong from the Jurchens. Based on historical documents, Li Rusong's 6th generation ancestor Li Ying (李英) was originally from present-day North Korea, but there are historical documents which state that the further ancestors were from central China who moved to Korea during wartime.

Li Rusong was ultimately captured and executed when the Mongols invaded Liaodong province.

Military career 

Li Rusong's first rise of fame was in early 1592, when he managed to defeat a major rebellion at Ningxia. The Ming army had been unable to move the rebels holed up in the city for the first 6 months, but after Li arrived the city fell within 3 months. Li was able to divert the waters of the Yellow River directly into the city, which led to its fall. He was immediately appointed the chief general of the expedition into Korea after this; he led a force of some 36,000 into Korea in the last few days of 1592.  Together with Ming administrator Song Yingchang, Li Rusong was generally successful in Korea, first retaking the city of Pyongyang in a direct assault within two weeks of setting off (on January 8 of 1593), and then took back the city of Kaesong a couple week later. As he marched south towards the Korean capital of Hanyang (漢陽) in later January, the Ming army clashed with the Japanese forces in the Battle of Byeokjegwan, which resulted in the Ming army being pushed back briefly. Within two months after this he succeeded in recapturing Hanyang. He ordered Chinese and Korean troops to refrain from killing all Japanese soldiers and grant them the right to retreat.

Sword
Li is known for the sword art jedok geom in Korean, which he presumably used during his stay in Korea. The Koreans published the sword-style in their martial arts manuals called Muyesinbo (1759) and Muyedobotongji (1791).

Death 
In April 1598, the Mongols invaded the Ming province of Liaodong from the north when Li Rusong was leading a small scouting group around its forests. Surrounded by thousands of Mongol cavalry, he could not escape, and was captured and subsequently killed. He was posthumously given the title of Zhonglie (忠烈) (Lord of Fidelity).

See also 

Ming dynasty
Yi Sun-sin
Deng Zilong

Notes

Ming dynasty generals
1549 births
1598 deaths
Chinese people of Korean descent
People of the Japanese invasions of Korea (1592–1598)